Roger Kirk (born November 2, 1930) is a career diplomat and former United States Ambassador to Somalia (1973–75) and Romania (1985–1989). He was born in Newport, Rhode Island.

Kirk received a BA from Princeton University in 1952 and served in the US Air Force from 1952 to 1955. From 1973 until 1975 he was the US Ambassador to Somalia. In 1978 he was nominated to be the Deputy Representative of the US to the International Atomic Energy Agency, in which capacity he served from 1978 until 1983. From 1985 until 1989 he was the US Ambassador to Romania. He is a member of the American Academy of Diplomacy.

References 

Atlantic Council 
1930 births
Living people
Ambassadors of the United States to Somalia
Ambassadors of the United States to Romania
People from Newport, Rhode Island